The Communist Party of Germany (abbreviated KPD) is an anti-revisionist Marxist-Leninist communist party in Germany. It is one of several parties which claim the KPD name and/or legacy. It was founded in Berlin in 1990.

History
The KPD, also known as KPD-Ost or KPD (Rote Fahne), was founded in 1990 in the GDR, after the Fall of the Berlin Wall but before the eventual German reunification by members of the Socialist Unity Party of Germany (SED) who opposed the reforms from the party's new leadership and wanted to stay loyal to Marxism-Leninism.

It competed unsuccessfully in the 1990 Volkskammer election, the only multi-party election held in the GDR.

The KPD was exempt from the West German ban on the KPD from 1956, due to a provision in the German reunification treaty which guarantees the continued legality of parties founded in the former GDR. However, this KPD-ban was already circumvented in 1968 with the foundation of a new West German communist party, the German Communist Party (DKP). The KPD and the DKP remain to exist as separate parties and occasionally cooperate politically.

Following Erich Honecker's expulsion from SED, KPD offered him and his wife Margot their party membership, which they gladly accepted.

Today the KPD remains a small party with its main strongholds being in the Neue Länder. It has competed in Bundestag, Landtag and local elections, but so far has only managed to gain one mandate in the city of Zeitz between 2004 and 2014. The party stood candidates in the 2019 state election in Thuringia and Saxony.

In 2002 the KPD founded its youth wing, the Young Communist League of Germany.

In 2020 KPD member Siegfried Kutschick, elected to the Zeitz city council under the Wir für unsere Stadt banner, was expelled from the party for joining the Alternative for Germany (AfD) council caucus. After a week of protests from the KPD and other leftwing organizations, Kutschick reconsidered and left the AfD caucus. Nevertheless Kutschick was expelled from the KPD.

Ideology 
The party upholds a strict anti-revisionist Marxist-Leninist line, and states that it "consistently fights revisionism, opportunism and its main form, anti-Stalinism." It recognizes the German Democratic Republic (DDR), the Union of Soviet Socialist Republics (USSR), especially during the leadership of Stalin, and other former Soviet allied states as examples of real existing socialism. It also holds a positive view on the Democratic People's Republic of Korea, its leadership, both Kim Jong-il and his successor Kim Jong-un, and the leading ideologies of the nation, being Juche and Songun. On the subject of the first leader of the state, Kim Il-sung it claims that he was "a great politician, that acquired himself big merits in the modern political history and left behind definite traces".

Famous members 
Despite being a small party, it managed to attract a number of prominent members, mostly those from the former leadership of the Socialist Unity Party (SED). Both Erich Honecker and his wife Margot became members of the KPD after being expelled from the reformed SED in 1990, Margot Honecker even becoming an honorary member.

Irma Thälmann, the daughter of Ernst Thälmann, became a member of the KPD after leaving the Party of Democratic Socialism, due to the re-evaluation of her father's legacy by the party. She was a candidate for the KPD at the 1994 Bundestag election for the district of Berlin-Lichtenberg, gaining 266 votes (0.17%).

Electoral history

See also

Communist Party of Germany (disambiguation)
Historical, original KPD, founded in 1919

References

External links
 
Campaign video of the KPD for the 1990 Volkskammer election

1990 establishments in Germany
Communist parties in Germany
Anti-revisionist organizations
Neo-Stalinist parties
Far-left politics in Germany
Political parties established in 1990